The Nakhchivan rock signs were found in 2016 at  between the villages of Ərəfsə and Milax in the Culfa region of Azerbaijan.

Description
Three rock signs were found in Agsal. A common feature of the rock sign drainage channels is that they are directed towards the canyon, indicating the possibility of fluid flow from them. The presence of rock marks on the graves suggests that some of them were used for cult purposes. The fact that the graves are next to the rock signs and some rock signs are used as wishing wells  supports this view. It is interesting that around the Agsal rock shields there is a wishing tree that is visited by today's villagers.

Signs such as those found in Nakhchivan are very common in Southern Azerbaijan and Eastern Anatolia.

References

Further reading

Weblinks 
 Urartu dövlətinin Cənubi Qafqaz siyasətindən bəhs edən monoqrafiya təqdim olunub
 AMEA Naxçıvan Bölməsinin Tarix, Etnoqrafiya və Arxeologiya İnstitutunda Urartu dövlətinin Cənubi Qafqaz siyasətindən bəhs edən monoqrafiya təqdim olunub 

Tells (archaeology)
Prehistoric sites in Azerbaijan
Archaeological sites in Azerbaijan
Ancient pottery
Neolithic sites of Asia